Golak Bugni Bank Te Batua  is a 2018 comedy Indian-Punjabi film directed by Ksshitij Chaudhary. It stars Amrinder Gill, Aditi Sharma, Simi Chahal, Harish Verma, Jaswinder Bhalla, B.N. Sharma in lead roles. Golak Bugni Bank Te Batua was  released worldwide on 13 April 2018.

Plot
The story starts in India in 1977–78 and the story goes back and forth between 1977–78 and 2016. The story starts with Bhola in 1977 in the village of Bassi Pathana in Punjab, India. Bhola is an innocent young man who is helpful and kind to all. He usually helps the villagers. The story comes to present time in 2016 where in Bassi Pathana there is a market where two shop owners Chaman Laal Sachdeva and Satpal Aneja  are portrayed. The two are rivals and want to be the market heads. Neeta, son of Chaman Laal works with him in their ladies suit shop and Mishri and her father Satpal runs a sweet shop. Both are shown hating each other because of the family rivalry but soon comes closer.  They elope because of their fathers; denial for their marriage with the funds collected for Jaagran on 8 November 2016 and go to a hotel to stay for night.

But things turn upside down when the ₹500 and ₹1000 notes are demonetised by the Govt. They return to their homes and start living life normally. Neeta sees their friend Kiran's marriage being pulled back due to the dowry amount not being given and with help of Mishri and her friends tries to arrange the dowry.

Here we see a flashback where Bhola was at Shindi's house and Shindi's brother disliked his presence there and takes him to the panchayat where he is asked by the panchayat to marry Shindi if he can build a house for themselves at a land allotted by panchayat which will take ₹1000 to construct.

He accepts this and wants to earn money, He went back with money but the demonetization in 1978 under Janta Party Government led to the earnings going in vain. The villagers helped him and the story is set back to 2016 where at the wedding of Kiran the Neeta and Mishri succeed in convincing Kiran's father-in-law to let the wedding happen.

Cast

 Harish Verma as Neeta
 Simi Chahal as Mishri
 Amrinder Gill as Bhola
 Aditi Sharma as Shindi
 Jaswinder Bhalla as Chaman Lal Sachdeva
 Simran Sehajpal as Neeta's mother
 B.N. Sharma as Satpal aneja Halwai
 Anita Devgan as Gollu's mother
 Sumit Gulati as Gollu
 Rohit sawal as Sonu (hair dresser)
 Pukhraj Bhalla as Kala
 Gurshabad as Doji (Milkman) 
 Rajesh Sharma (actor) as Money Exchanger
 Gagan Mehra as Kiran
 Vijay Tandon as MLA
 Master Saleem as himself (cameo appearance)

Soundtrack

References

External links
  
Golak Bugni Bank Te Batua Trailer

Punjabi-language Indian films
Indian comedy films
2018 comedy films
Films scored by Jatinder Shah